West Branch Pleasant River may refer to:

West Branch Pleasant River (Piscataquis River), a tributary of the Piscataquis River in Piscataquis County, Maine
West Branch Pleasant River (Pleasant River), a tributary of the Pleasant River in Maine
West Branch Pleasant River (Addison, Maine), a tributary of the Pleasant River in Washington County, Maine

See also
East Branch Pleasant River (disambiguation)
Pleasant River (disambiguation)